Caney is a census-designated place (CDP) in Cherokee County, Oklahoma, United States, within the Cherokee Nation. It was first listed as a CDP prior to the 2020 census. It includes the unincorporated community of Tailholt.

The CDP is in eastern Cherokee County, bordered to the south by Tenkiller, to the west by Etta, to the north by Welling, and to the east by Adair County.

The majority of the CDP is drained by Caney Creek, which flows southwest to join the Illinois River in Tenkiller Ferry Lake.

Demographics

References 

Census-designated places in Cherokee County, Oklahoma
Census-designated places in Oklahoma